The 2018–19 Dallas Stars season was the 52nd season for the National Hockey League franchise that was established on June 5, 1967, and 26th season since the franchise relocated from Minnesota prior to the start of the 1993–94 NHL season. The Stars clinched a playoff spot on April 2, 2019, after a 6–2 win against the Philadelphia Flyers. They defeated the Nashville Predators in the First Round, and faced the St. Louis Blues in the Second Round, where they were defeated in seven games.

Standings

Schedule and results

Preseason
The preseason schedule was published on June 13, 2018.

Regular season
The regular season schedule was released on June 21, 2018.

Playoffs

The Stars faced the Nashville Predators in the First Round of the playoffs, and defeated them in six games.

The Stars faced the St. Louis Blues in the Second Round of the playoffs, and were defeated in seven games.

Player statistics
As of May 7, 2019

Skaters

Goaltenders

†Denotes player spent time with another team before joining the Stars. Stats reflect time with the Stars only.
‡Denotes player was traded mid-season. Stats reflect time with the Stars only.
Bold/italics denotes franchise record.

Transactions
The Stars have been involved in the following transactions during the 2018–19 season.

Trades

Free agents

Waivers

Contract terminations

Retirement

Signings

Draft picks

Below are the Dallas Stars' selections at the 2018 NHL Entry Draft, which was held on June 22 and 23, 2018, at the American Airlines Center in Dallas, Texas.

Notes:
 The Chicago Blackhawks' fourth-round pick went to the Dallas Stars as the result of a trade on February 28, 2017, that sent Johnny Oduya to Chicago in exchange for Mark McNeill and this pick (being conditional at the time of the trade).

References

Dallas Stars seasons
Dallas Stars
Dallas Stars
Dallas Stars
2010s in Dallas
2018 in Texas
2019 in Texas